The 188th Massachusetts General Court, consisting of the Massachusetts Senate and the Massachusetts House of Representatives, met in 2013 and 2014 during the governorship of Deval Patrick. Therese Murray served as president of the Senate and Robert DeLeo served as speaker of the House.

Senators

Representatives

See also
 113th United States Congress
 List of Massachusetts General Courts

References

External links

 
  (2013, 2014)
  (includes some video)

Political history of Massachusetts
Massachusetts legislative sessions
massachusetts
2013 in Massachusetts
massachusetts
2014 in Massachusetts